Malheur may refer to:

 Malheur County, Oregon
 Malheur Lake
 Malheur River
 Malheur Butte
 Malheur National Wildlife Refuge
 Occupation of the Malheur National Wildlife Refuge
 Malheur Reservation
 Malheur National Forest
 Malheur Memorial Hospital Heliport
 Malheur Bell
 Malheur Brewery